Irina Edvinovna Minkh (born 16 April 1964) is a Russian former basketball player who competed in the 1988 Summer Olympics and in the 1992 Summer Olympics.

October 4, 2018, the mayor of Novosibirsk Anatoly Lokot said he appointed Irina Minkh as the Sports Adviser to the Mayor.

References

1964 births
Living people
Russian women's basketball players
Olympic basketball players of the Soviet Union
Olympic basketball players of the Unified Team
Basketball players at the 1988 Summer Olympics
Basketball players at the 1992 Summer Olympics
Olympic bronze medalists for the Soviet Union
Olympic gold medalists for the Unified Team
Olympic medalists in basketball
Soviet women's basketball players
Medalists at the 1992 Summer Olympics
Medalists at the 1988 Summer Olympics